Vladimir Bening (born 1954) is a Russian mathematician, Professor, Dr.Sc., a professor at the Faculty of Computer Science at the Moscow State University.

He defended the thesis «Asymptotic analysis of distributions of some asymptotically efficient statistics in problems of hypothesis testing» for the degree of Doctor of Physical and Mathematical Sciences (1998).

Was awarded the title of Professor (2005).

Author of 16 books and more than 100 scientific articles.

References

Literature

External links
 MSU CMC
 Scientific works of Vladimir Bening
 Scientific works of Vladimir Bening

Russian computer scientists
Russian mathematicians
Living people
Academic staff of Moscow State University
1954 births
Moscow State University alumni